Marietta Township is a township in Marshall County, Iowa, USA.

History
Marietta Township was established in 1852.

References

Townships in Marshall County, Iowa
Townships in Iowa